Kooijman is a Dutch language occupational surname. Kooij is an archaic spelling of kooi ("cage"), generally referring to a pen or a duck decoy, and the name often originated with a herder, duck breeder, or cage maker. The ij digraph is often replaced with a "y". Among other variant spellings are Cooijman, Kooijmans, and Kooiman. People with the surname include:

Kooijman(s) 
Dick Kooijman (born 1972), Dutch football player 
Femke Kooijman (born 1978), Dutch field hockey player
Hendrik Jan Kooijman (born 1960), Dutch field hockey player
 (born 1994), Dutch racing cyclist
Marjolein Kooijman (born 1980), Dutch bass player
 (1891–1975), Dutch anarchist
Pieter Kooijmans (1933–2013), Dutch jurist, politician and diplomat, Minister of Foreign Affairs 1993-94
Kooyman(s)
Barbara Kooyman (born 1958), American singer-songwriter
Frank I. Kooyman (1880–1963), Dutch-born Mormon hymnwriter
Piet Kooyman (1929–1988), Dutch racing cyclist 
George Kooymans (born 1948), Dutch guitarist and vocalist of Golden Earring

References

See also
Kooyman Peak, Antarctic mountain named for the American antarctic biologist Gerald L. Kooyman

Dutch-language surnames
Occupational surnames